Nine Hours to Rama is 1963 British-American neo noir crime film directed by Mark Robson, that follows a fictionalised Nathuram Godse in the hours before he assassinated the Indian independence leader, Gandhi, and police attempts to prevent the murder. It is based on a 1962 novel of the same name by Stanley Wolpert. The movie was written by Nelson Gidding and filmed in England and India with mainly white actors in prominent roles. It stars Horst Buchholz, Diane Baker, Jose Ferrer, and Robert Morley. It was shot in CinemaScope DeLuxe Color.

Plot
The film is a fictional narrative set in the nine hours in the life of Nathuram Godse (Horst Buchholz) that led up to his assassination of Mohandas Karamchand Gandhi (J.S. Casshyap). As he prepares for the shooting at Gandhi's residence, flashbacks recall Godse's hostility to Muslims during the Partition, his adherence to Hindu Mahasabha that hatches the plot to kill Gandhi, and his involvement with a married woman Rani (Valerie Gearon) and a prostitute Sheila (Diane Baker). Meanwhile, a police officer Supt. Gopal Das (Jose Ferrer) attempts to find the killer before it is too late.

Cast

 J. S. Casshyap as Mohandas Karamchand Gandhi
 Horst Buchholz as Nathuram Godse
 Jose Ferrer as Supt. Gopal Das
 Valerie Gearon as Rani Mehta
 Don Borisenko as Naryan Apte
 Robert Morley as P.K. Mussadi
 Diane Baker as Sheila
 Harry Andrews as Gen. Singh
 Basdeo Panday as Laundryman
 P. Jairaj as G. D. Birla
 David Abraham Cheulkar as Detective Munda
 Achala Sachdev as Mother
 Marne Maitland as Karnick
 Harold Goldblatt as Selvrag Prahlad
 Wolfe Morris as Detective Bose
 Francis Matthews	as Rampure
 Nagendra Nath as Magin Mehta
 Jack Hedley as Kilpatrick
 Lal Bahadur as Beggar (uncredited)
 R.S. Bansal as Astrologer (uncredited)
 Ishaq Bux	as Gardener (uncredited)
 Christopher Carlos as Shankar (uncredited)
 Kurt Christian as Young Natu (uncredited)
 Joseph Cuby as Chacko (uncredited)
 Allan Cuthbertson	as Captain Goff (uncredited)
 Shay Gorman as Duty Officer (uncredited)
 Peter Illing as Frank Ramamurti (uncredited)
 Jagdev as Detective (uncredited)
 Harold Kasket as Datta (uncredited)
 Thali Kouri as The Madame (uncredited)
 Kunlan Malik as Bus Conductor (uncredited)
 Manohargin as Policeman (uncredited)
 Sheri Mohan as Detective (uncredited)
 Bobby R. Naidoo as Retiring Room Manager (uncredited)
 Frank Olegario as Barburao (uncredited)
 Shashi Pameholi as Young Apte (uncredited)
 Nigel Phoenix as SNS Boy (uncredited)
 Jagdish Raj as Detective (uncredited)
 S.N. Selk as Father (uncredited)
 M.Y. Shaikh as Policeman (uncredited)
 Julian Sherrier as P.K.'s Secretary (uncredited)
 Keshov Singh as Detective (uncredited)
 Rani Verma as Sita (uncredited)

Awards
 BAFTA Award for Best Cinematography (Colour) – Arthur Ibbetson (nominated)

See also
List of American films of 1963
List of artistic depictions of Mahatma Gandhi

References

External links
 
 
 
 

1963 films
1963 drama films
American drama films
CinemaScope films
Films about assassinations
Films based on American novels
Films directed by Mark Robson
Films set in India
Films set in Delhi
Cultural depictions of Mahatma Gandhi
Works about the Mahatma Gandhi assassination
Films scored by Malcolm Arnold
Censored books
Films about Mahatma Gandhi
Film censorship in India
Film controversies in India
Films shot at MGM-British Studios
1960s English-language films
1960s American films